Theophilus Aondofa Awua (born 24 April 1998) is a Nigerian professional footballer who plays as a midfielder for Italian  club Crotone on loan from Pro Vercelli.

Club career
He made his Serie C debut for Juve Stabia on 16 September 2017 in a game against Trapani.

Coming back to Spezia, he scored a goal against Pro Vercelli in the match was over 5-1 for the aquilotti.

On 5 July 2018, he joined Serie C club Rende on a season-long loan.

On 2 September 2019, he joined Serie C club Bari on loan from Spezia. On 30 January 2020, he was loaned to Livorno.

On 8 September 2020 he joined Cittadella on loan.

On 21 January 2021 he joined Pro Vercelli on loan. In June 2021, he joined to the club  permanently.

On 12 January 2022 he went to Crotone on loan. On 19 July 2022, Awua returned to Crotone on a new loan with an obligation to buy.

References

External links
 

1998 births
Living people
People from Makurdi
Nigerian footballers
Association football midfielders
Abuja F.C. players
Serie B players
Serie C players
Spezia Calcio players
S.S. Juve Stabia players
Rende Calcio 1968 players
S.S.C. Bari players
U.S. Livorno 1915 players
A.S. Cittadella players
F.C. Pro Vercelli 1892 players
F.C. Crotone players
Nigerian expatriate footballers
Expatriate footballers in Italy
Nigerian expatriate sportspeople in Italy